Pseudolycopodiella is a genus of non-seed plants in the Lycopodiaceae, long considered part of Lycopodium, but now recognized as a separate genus. It has 10–14 recognized species, only one in North America: Pseudolycopodiella caroliniana.

Species
, the Checklist of Ferns and Lycophytes of the World recognized the following species:

Pseudolycopodiella affinis (Bory) Holub
Pseudolycopodiella brevipedunculata (Alderw.) Holub
Pseudolycopodiella carnosa (Silveira) Holub
Pseudolycopodiella caroliniana (L.) Holub
Pseudolycopodiella contexta (C.Mart.) Holub
Pseudolycopodiella iuliformis (Underw. & F.E.Lloyd) Holub
Pseudolycopodiella krameriana (B. Øllg.) B. Øllg.
Pseudolycopodeilla limosa (Chinnock) A.R.Field
Pseudolycopodiella meridionalis (Underw. & F.E.Lloyd) Holub
Pseudolycopodiella paradoxa (Mart.) Holub
Pseudolycopodiella sarcocaulos (Kuhn) Holub
Pseudolycopodiella tatei (A.C.Sm.) Holub
Pseudolycopodiella tuberosa (Kuhn) Holub

References

Lycopodiaceae
Lycophyte genera